Stuart Price (born 9 September 1977) is a three-time Grammy-winning British electronic musician, songwriter, and record producer known for his work with artists including Madonna, The Killers, New Order, Kylie Minogue, Example, Take That, Missy Elliott, Scissor Sisters, Pet Shop Boys, Brandon Flowers, Gwen Stefani, Seal, Keane, Frankmusik , Hard-Fi, Hurts, Everything Everything and Darin. His acts include British electronic pop/rock band Zoot Woman (with Adam Blake and Johnny Blake), Les Rythmes Digitales, Paper Faces, Man With Guitar, Thin White Duke (not to be confused with David Bowie's earlier persona of the same name), and the parodic French moniker Jacques Lu Cont (though he actually grew up in Reading, England). Price receives songwriting or production credit for the following songs:

Discography of songs written and produced by Stuart Price

Remixography

References

 
 
British songwriters
British record producers